Major General Brian Herbert Chappel,  (25 November 1895 – 14 November 1964) was a British soldier who served during the First World War and Second World War.

References
Auction - The Second World War D.S.O. and 2 bars awarded to Major General B.H. Chappel, Indian Army, and commanding officer at Heraklion during the Battle of Crete
Generals of World War II

1895 births
1964 deaths
British Indian Army generals
Battle of Crete
Companions of the Distinguished Service Order
Indian Army personnel of World War I
Indian Army generals of World War II
Commandants of the Staff College, Quetta